Ivana Đerisilo-Stankovic (born 8 August 1983) is a volleyball player from Serbia, playing as an outside hitter. She was a member of the Women's National Team that won the bronze medal at the 2006 FIVB World Championship in Japan. She plays for the club CSM Târgoviște.

References
 FIVB profile

External links
Ivana Đerisilo - official website 

1983 births
Living people
Sportspeople from Belgrade
Serbian women's volleyball players
Eczacıbaşı volleyball players
Galatasaray S.K. (women's volleyball) players
Olympic volleyball players of Serbia
Volleyball players at the 2008 Summer Olympics
Volleyball players at the 2012 Summer Olympics
Serbian expatriate sportspeople in Italy
Serbian expatriate sportspeople in Turkey
Serbian expatriate sportspeople in Switzerland
Serbian expatriate sportspeople in Romania
Serbian expatriate sportspeople in Azerbaijan
Serbian expatriate sportspeople in Poland
Universiade medalists in volleyball
Universiade silver medalists for Serbia
Medalists at the 2009 Summer Universiade